Brian William Pallister (born July 6, 1954) is a Canadian politician who served as the 22nd premier of Manitoba from 2016 until 2021. He served as leader of the Progressive Conservative Party of Manitoba from 2012 to 2021. He was previously a cabinet minister in the provincial government of Gary Filmon and a member of the House of Commons of Canada from 2000 to 2008.

Early life and career
Pallister was born in Portage la Prairie, Manitoba, the son of Anne Ethel (Poyser) and Bill Pallister. He holds Bachelor of Arts and Bachelor of Education degrees from Brandon University. From 1976 to 1979, he worked as a high school teacher in rural Manitoba, where he also served as the local union representative. He later became a chartered financial analyst. Pallister is also a skilled curler and won the provincial mixed curling championship in 2000. This qualified him for the 2001 Canadian Mixed Curling Championship, which he finished with a 3–8 record in second last place.

Provincial politics
Pallister began his political career at the provincial level, winning a by-election in Portage la Prairie on September 15, 1992, as a candidate of the Progressive Conservative Party of Manitoba. He entered the provincial legislature as a backbench supporter of the Filmon government and pushed for balanced budget legislation. In 1993, he endorsed Jean Charest's bid to lead the Progressive Conservative Party of Canada.

Pallister was reelected in the 1995 provincial election, and sworn into cabinet on May 9, 1995, as Minister of Government Services. He carried out reforms that eliminated almost 3,000 pages of statutory regulations as part of a government campaign against regulations, presided over changes to the Manitoba Disaster Assistance Board, and oversaw provincial flood claims. He stepped down from cabinet on January 6, 1997, to prepare for his first federal campaign.

Pallister defeated Paul-Emile Labossiere to win the Progressive Conservative nomination for Portage—Lisgar in the 1997 federal election, and formally resigned his seat in the legislature on April 28, 1997. He lost to Reform Party incumbent Jake Hoeppner by 1,449 votes.

There were rumours that Pallister would campaign to succeed Filmon as leader of the Progressive Conservative Party of Manitoba in 2000, but he declined.

Federal politics

1998 Progressive Conservative Party of Canada leadership bid

In 1998, Pallister campaigned for the leadership of the federal Progressive Conservative Party on a platform designed to win back voters who had left the party for Reform. His supporters included former cabinet ministers Don Mazankowski and Charlie Mayer, Senator Consiglio Di Nino, and Jim Jones, the sole Progressive Conservative representative in the House of Commons from Ontario. He finished fourth on the first ballot of the 1998 Progressive Conservative leadership election with 12.5% support, behind David Orchard, Hugh Segal, and the eventual winner, former Prime Minister Joe Clark. He withdrew from the contest a few days later, and declined to endorse another candidate. Pallister said that Progressive Conservatives had "voted for the past" and missed an opportunity to renew themselves.

Canadian Alliance MP

In July 2000, Pallister wrote an open letter to Joe Clark announcing his candidacy in the next federal election with a dual endorsement from the Progressive Conservative and Canadian Alliance associations in Portage-Lisgar. The latter party was a successor to Reform, and emerged from the efforts of Reformers to merge with Blue Tory elements in the Progressive Conservative Party who opposed Clark's Red Tory leadership. Clark had previously rejected Pallister's proposal as a violation of the Progressive Conservative Party's constitution, and did not respond to the letter. As a result, Pallister left the Progressive Conservatives and joined the Alliance on August 17, 2000. He won his new party's nomination for Portage—Lisgar over Dennis Desrochers and former MP Felix Holtmann, in a contest marked by some bitterness.

Pallister was elected to the House of Commons in the 2000 general election, defeating his nearest opponent by over 10,000 votes. Hoeppner, running as an independent, finished in a distant fourth place. The Liberal Party won a majority government, and Pallister served on the opposition benches. He did not openly endorse anyone in the 2002 Canadian Alliance leadership election.

Conservative MP

The Canadian Alliance and Progressive Conservative parties merged on December 7, 2003, and Pallister became a member of the resulting Conservative Party of Canada. He considered launching a bid for the new party's leadership, but instead endorsed outgoing Alliance leader Stephen Harper for the position. He was easily reelected in the 2004 election, in which the Liberals were reduced to a minority government. In July 2004, he was appointed to the Official Opposition Shadow Cabinet as critic for National Revenue.

Pallister gained increased national prominence in September 2005 after drawing attention to $750,000 of apparent spending irregularities in the office of David Dingwall, the Chief Executive Officer of the Royal Canadian Mint. Dingwall resigned after the accusations were publicized, but later claimed that his expenditures were inaccurately reported and fell within official guidelines. An independent review completed in late October 2005 found only minor discrepancies in Dingwall's expenses, amounting to less than $7,000. Pallister criticized this review as "little more than a whitewash", and argued that the auditors failed to include numerous ambiguous expenses.

Pallister sang a parody of Pink Floyd's "Another Brick in the Wall, Part Two" in the House of Commons on October 3, 2005, during the "Statements by Members" session before Question Period. The adjusted lyrics attacked David Dingwall and the Liberal government. The Speaker ruled him out of order.

Before the 2006 federal election, the Winnipeg Free Press reported that some Manitoba Progressive Conservatives were trying to persuade Pallister to challenge Stuart Murray for the provincial leadership. Murray subsequently resigned, after 45% of delegates at the party's November 2005 convention voted for a leadership review. A subsequent Free Press poll showed Pallister as the second-most popular choice to succeed Murray, after fellow MP Vic Toews. Pallister campaigned for reelection at the federal level and was noncommittal about his provincial ambitions.

Pallister was easily reelected in 2006. The Conservatives won a minority government, and Pallister requested that incoming Prime Minister Stephen Harper not consider him for a cabinet portfolio while he was making his decision about entering provincial politics. On February 17, 2006, he announced that he would not seek the provincial party leadership and would remain a federal MP. He was appointed chair of the House of Commons standing committee on Finance, and in 2007 indicated that he wanted to remove financial access to offshore tax havens such as Barbados. Later in the year, he was appointed parliamentary secretary to the Minister of International Trade and to the Minister for International Cooperation.

Pallister surprised political observers in January 2008 by announcing that he would not run in the next federal election.

Return to provincial politics

Leader of the Progressive Conservative Party of Manitoba 
After the 2011 provincial election, Hugh McFadyen announced his resignation as leader of the Progressive Conservative Party of Manitoba. On April 11, 2012, Pallister announced his intention to seek the party's leadership. On July 28, he became the presumptive nominee when the nomination process closed with no other candidates entered, and was acclaimed as leader on July 30, 2012. Two months later, he easily won a by-election for McFadyen's seat of Fort Whyte in southwest Winnipeg.

Pallister came under fire by his critics for some off-color remarks he made while opposition leader. In 2013, when filming a holiday greeting, he called atheists "infidels". Pallister said that he never intended to offend anyone with the statement.

During a debate in the Legislature on November 24, 2014, Pallister expressed his personal disdain for Halloween when talking about the NDP's PST tax increase. He compared the government's move to that of the holiday and said Halloween was bad for the integrity of children. The video went viral a year after the statement was made.

2016 Manitoba general election
On April 14, 2016, a CBC News report revealed that Pallister had traveled to Costa Rica 15 times since elected to Manitoba MLA in 2012. Since then, he spent about 240 days either in Costa Rica or en route.

Pallister's Tories went into the election having led in most opinion polls for almost four years. The NDP had been permanently crippled when it raised the provincial sales tax after promising not to do so. Pallister led his party to a decisive victory over the NDP, claiming 40 of the 57 available seats in the legislature – the biggest majority government in recent Manitoba history. He also became the first Progressive Conservative premier of the province since Filmon lost the 1999 election.

Premier of Manitoba

Pallister and his cabinet were sworn in on May 3, 2016. He was reelected with a slightly decreased majority 2019. On August 10, 2021, he announced that he would be resigning on September 1 and not be seeking re-election in the next provincial election. Deputy Premier Kelvin Goertzen was chosen as interim leader of the PCs to serve until another leader is elected in a leadership election. Goertzen officially took over as premier on September 1, and Pallister resigned his seat in the legislature on October 4, 2021. Health Minister Heather Stefanson was elected as Pallister's permanent successor on October 30, and was sworn in as premier on November 2.

Carbon tax court challenge

Pallister, just like fellow conservative premiers Doug Ford, Jason Kenney and Scott Moe, is opposed to Prime Minister Justin Trudeau's federal-imposed carbon tax. In 2019, Pallister's government filed a court challenge against it. On March 25, 2021, when the Supreme Court of Canada ruled that the federal government's carbon tax plan is constitutional, Pallister said that Manitoba will continue the challenge.

COVID-19 pandemic

Pallister led the provincial government response to the COVID-19 pandemic in Manitoba. In December 2020, he received international attention and praise on social media for his "impassioned plea" for adherence to social distancing restrictions during the Holiday season to keep people safe.  However, many of these social media posts were later taken down when it came to light that Manitobans were reported as finding the province's response too slow, waiting for infection rates to soar before increasing restrictions, allowing the virus a rapid spread into October and November, when the province witnessed the worst per capita rate of infection in Canada. Critics of Pallister's government blamed the surge of COVID-19 cases in part on Pallister's Restart Manitoba plan, which encouraged the re-opening of the provincial economy in direct opposition to the advice of many Manitoba doctors. Pallister faced similar criticism during the third wave of the virus in May 2021, with changes to the Public Health Orders coming weeks after some critics first called for. Critics rejected his assertions that the province had already imposed some of the toughest restrictions in the country, with Opposition Party Leaders alleging he was not competent to govern in a pandemic. The Pallister government's slow response during the third wave further led to a lack of space in intensive care units in Manitoba and the transfer of several patients to hospitals out of province in Thunder Bay, Sault Ste Marie, North Bay, and Ottawa, many of whom died either en route or far from family and advocates.

Indigenous relations

On July 7, 2021, Pallister gained controversy when he made remarks about colonial settlers, some who operated the Canadian Indian residential school system, stating that "the people [colonists] who came here to this country, before it was a country and since, didn't come here to destroy anything. They came here to build. They came to build better." The comments prompted his Minister of Indigenous Reconciliation and Northern Relations, Eileen Clarke, to resign. Her successor, Alan Lagimodiere, instantly gained controversy after he defended the residential school system, saying that "At the time I think the intent…they thought they were doing the right thing. In retrospect, it's easy to judge in the past. But at the time, they really thought that they were doing the right thing."

Electoral record

2019 Manitoba general election

2016 Manitoba general election

2012 by-election 

 
|Progressive Conservative
|Brian Pallister
|align="right"|3,626
|align="right"|55.18
|align="right"|-7.29
|align="right"|

 
|Independent
|Darrell Ackman
|align="right"|19
|align="right"|0.29
|align="right"|
|align="right"|
|- bgcolor="white"
!align="right" colspan=3|Total valid votes
!align="right"|6,571
!align="right"|100.00
!align="right"|
|align="right"|
|- bgcolor="white"
!align="right" colspan=3|Rejected and declined votes
!align="right"|8
!align="right"|
!align="right"|
|align="right"|
|- bgcolor="white"
!align="right" colspan=3|Turnout
!align="right"|6,579
!align="right"|42.28
!align="right"|-19.63
|align="right"|
|- bgcolor="white"
!align="right" colspan=3|Electors on the lists
!align="right"|15,560
!align="right"|
!align="right"|
|align="right"|
|}

2006 Canadian federal election

2004 Canadian federal election

2000 Canadian federal election

1997 Canadian federal election

1995 Manitoba general election

1992 by-election

All electoral information is taken from Elections Canada and Elections Manitoba. Provincial expenditures refer to individual candidate expenses. Italicized expenditures refer to submitted totals, and are presented when the final reviewed totals are not available.

References

External links
 
 

1954 births
Living people
Premiers of Manitoba
People from Portage la Prairie
Politicians from Winnipeg
Curlers from Manitoba
Canadian Alliance MPs
Conservative Party of Canada MPs
Progressive Conservative Party of Manitoba MLAs
Members of the Executive Council of Manitoba
Members of the House of Commons of Canada from Manitoba
Canadian sportsperson-politicians
Progressive Conservative Party of Canada leadership candidates
Brandon University alumni
20th-century Canadian politicians
21st-century Canadian politicians